Encog is a machine learning framework available for Java and .Net.
Encog supports different learning algorithms such as Bayesian Networks, Hidden Markov Models and Support Vector Machines.
However, its main strength lies in its neural network algorithms. Encog contains classes to create a wide variety of networks, as well as support classes to normalize and process data for these neural networks. Encog trains using many different techniques.  Multithreading is used to allow optimal training performance on multicore machines.

Encog can be used for many tasks, including medical and financial research. A GUI based workbench is also provided to help model and train neural networks.  Encog has been in active development since 2008.

Neural Network Architectures
 ADALINE Neural Network
 Adaptive Resonance Theory 1 (ART1)
 Bidirectional Associative Memory (BAM)
 Boltzmann Machine
 Counterpropagation Neural Network (CPN)
 Elman Recurrent Neural Network
 Neuroevolution of augmenting topologies (NEAT)
 Feedforward Neural Network (Perceptron)
 Hopfield Neural Network
 Jordan Recurrent Neural Network
 Radial Basis Function Network
 Recurrent Self Organizing Map (RSOM)
 Self Organizing Map (Kohonen)

Training techniques
 Backpropagation
 Resilient Propagation (RProp)
 Scaled Conjugate Gradient (SCG)
 Levenberg–Marquardt algorithm
 Manhattan Update Rule Propagation
 Competitive learning
 Hopfield Learning
 Genetic algorithm training
 Instar Training
 Outstar Training
 ADALINE Training

See also
 JOONE: another neural network programmed in Java
 FANN, a neural network written in C with bindings to most other languages.
 Deeplearning4j: An open-source deep learning library written for Java/C++ w/LSTMs and convolutional networks. Parallelization with Apache Spark and Aeron on CPUs and GPUs.

References

External links
 Encog Homepage
 Encog Project (GitHub)
 Basic Market Forecasting with Encog Neural Networks (DevX Article)
 An Introduction to Encog Neural Networks for Java (Code Project)
 Benchmarking and Comparing Encog, Neuroph and JOONE Neural Networks

Neural network software
Free science software
Java (programming language) software
Free data analysis software